Zaza Janashia (born 10 February 1976) is a retired Georgian professional football player. Currently, Janashia works in children's sports school "Lokomotiv-Perovo" in Moscow.

Career
In Lokomotiv's 1998–99 UEFA Cup Winners' Cup campaign, he scored to put Lokomotiv ahead 1–0 in their first semifinal game against S.S. Lazio. Lazio equalized and then advanced to the finals after 0–0 draw in Rome.

Janashia was loaned back to FC Lokomotivi Tbilisi in April 2002.

Janashia had a brief spell in the Turkish Super Lig with Kocaelispor.

International career
Janashia made his Georgia debut on 7 June 1997 against Moldova, a 1998 World Cup qualifier. He also played 5 times in friendlies, three times in UEFA Euro 2000 qualifying, and played his last match in 2002 World Cup qualification match, against Romania on 28 March 2001.

International goals

Honours
Lokomotiv Moscow
Russian Cup: 1995–96, 1996–97, 1999–2000, 2000–01

Individual
 Top 33 players of the Russian Top Division: 1998, 1999

Personal life
He is the brother of Zamir Janashia.

References

External links
 

1976 births
Living people
Footballers from Tbilisi
Footballers from Georgia (country)
Georgia (country) international footballers
Expatriate footballers from Georgia (country)
FC Lokomotiv Moscow players
Russian Premier League players
Expatriate footballers in Russia
FC Baltika Kaliningrad players
Kocaelispor footballers
Expatriate footballers in Turkey
Expatriate sportspeople from Georgia (country) in Turkey
FC Zugdidi players
Association football forwards